Luka Stojanović (born 4 January 1994) is a Serbian professional footballer who plays as a midfielder for FK Čukarički.

Club career
On 6 October 2012, Stojanović made his debut with Sporting B in a 2012–13 Segunda Liga 2–0 win against Porto B, coming on as a substitute for João Mário. On 1 September 2014, he moved to Apollon Limassol, after two seasons in Portugal. In his first season with Apollon Limassol, Stojanović scored four goals in 19 games for the 2014–15 campaign. On 27 October 2014, Stojanović scored in his debut for match against Ethnikos Achnas.
In 2015–16 UEFA Europa League qualifications campaign he made his debut for Apollon Limassol in continental matches, against Saxan. In second leg match, he made his first score in UEFA competitions. At the beginning of 2018, Stojanović signed with the Serbian SuperLiga side Čukarički. On 20 February 2020, Stojanović signed with the Chicago Fire. Following the 2021 season, Stojanović's contract option was declined by Chicago. On 25 January 2022, Stojanović joined Saudi Arabian club Al-Hazem.

On 9 February 2023, Stojanović joined FK Čukarički.

Career statistics

Club

References

External links
 Luka Stojanovic - Official Website
 

1994 births
Living people
Serbian footballers
Serbia youth international footballers
Association football midfielders
Sporting CP footballers
Sporting CP B players
Apollon Limassol FC players
Royal Excel Mouscron players
Royal Antwerp F.C. players
FK Čukarički players
Chicago Fire FC players
Al-Hazem F.C. players
Liga Portugal 2 players
Cypriot First Division players
Belgian Pro League players
Serbian SuperLiga players
Major League Soccer players
Saudi Professional League players
Saudi First Division League players
Serbian expatriate footballers
Expatriate footballers in Portugal
Expatriate footballers in Cyprus
Expatriate footballers in Belgium
Expatriate soccer players in the United States
Expatriate footballers in Saudi Arabia
Serbian expatriate sportspeople in Portugal
Serbian expatriate sportspeople in Cyprus
Serbian expatriate sportspeople in Belgium
Serbian expatriate sportspeople in the United States
Serbian expatriate sportspeople in Saudi Arabia